Pavel Biryukov was a Russian film and stage actor.

Selected filmography 
 1909 — 16th Century Russian Wedding
 1910 — The Idiot
 1910 — Queen of Spades
 1911 — Defence of Sevastopol

References

External links 
 ПАВЕЛ БИРЮКОВ

Russian male film actors
Russian male stage actors
20th-century Russian male actors